The Bulgarian women's league (Bulgarian: Българска женска лига) also known as Swiss Capital League for sponsorship reasons,  is Bulgarian's top level league of women's football in Bulgaria.

It features fourteen teams that play a double round robin to decide the champion, which qualifies for a spot in the UEFA Women's Champions League. Because of the few teams in the country the league has no relegation to a second league.

2022–23 Teams

Champions
List of champions since 1985

 1985/86 Akademik Sofia
 1986/87 Akademik Sofia
 1987/88 Akademik Sofia
 1988/89 CSKA Sofia
 1989/90 Akademik Sofia
 1990/91 FC NSA Sofia
 1991/92 Lokomotiv Stara Zagora
 1992/93 CSKA Sofia
 1993/94 Grand Hotel Varna
 1994/95 Grand Hotel Varna
 1995/96 Grand Hotel Varna
 1996/97 Grand Hotel Varna
 1997/98 Grand Hotel Varna
 1998/99 Grand Hotel Varna
 1999/00 Grand Hotel Varna
 2000/01 Grand Hotel Varna
 2001/02 Grand Hotel Varna
 2002/03 Grand Hotel Varna
 2003/04 LP Super Sport Sofia
 2004/05 FC NSA Sofia
 2005/06 FC NSA Sofia
 2006/07 FC NSA Sofia
 2007/08 FC NSA Sofia
 2008/09: FC NSA Sofia
 2009/10: FC NSA Sofia
 2010/11: FC NSA Sofia
 2011/12: FC NSA Sofia
 2012/13: FC NSA Sofia
 2013/14: FC NSA Sofia
 2014/15: FC NSA Sofia
 2015/16: FC NSA Sofia
 2016/17: FC NSA Sofia
 2017/18: FC NSA Sofia
 2018/19: FC NSA Sofia
 2019/20: FC NSA Sofia
 2020/21: FC NSA Sofia
 2021/22: Lokomotiv Stara Zagora

By club

References

External links
Official Site
Bulgarian-Football.com
League at uefa.com
League at soccerway.com – standings, results, fixtures

Wom
Top level women's association football leagues in Europe
Football
Professional sports leagues in Bulgaria